The main qualification event for sailing at the 2016 Summer Olympics will be the 2014 ISAF Sailing World Championships. The rest of the quota places will be awarded at the 2015 World Championships and at Continental Qualification Events.

Qualification

Timeline

Progress

Summary

Men's events

Windsurfer – RS:X

One-person dinghy – Laser

Heavyweight one-person dinghy – Finn

Two-person dinghy – 470

Skiff – 49er

Women's events

Windsurfer – RS:X

One-person dinghy – Laser Radial

Two-person dinghy – 470

Skiff – 49erFX

Mixed events

Multihull – Nacra 17

References

Qualification for the 2016 Summer Olympics
Sailing at the 2016 Summer Olympics
2016